Wojciech Pawłak (born 31 October 1969) is a Polish former professional road cyclist. He competed at the 1988 Summer Olympics and the 1992 Summer Olympics.

Major results

1998
 8th Overall Course de Solidarność et des Champions Olympiques
2000
 4th Road race, National Road Championships
 5th Overall Course de Solidarność et des Champions Olympiques
2002
 2nd Time trial, National Road Championships
2003
 2nd Puchar Ministra Obrony Narodowej
 3rd Overall Szlakiem Grodów Piastowskich
2004
 3rd Overall Szlakiem Walk Majora Hubala
 4th Klasyk im. Wincentego Witosa
 8th Overall Szlakiem Grodów Piastowskich
 9th Overall Bałtyk–Karkonosze Tour
 9th Overall Tour du Maroc
2005
 2nd Puchar Uzdrowisk Karpackich
 2nd Majowy Wyścig Klasyczny-Lublin
 10th Pomorski Klasyk
2006
 1st Tartu GP
 3rd Overall Szlakiem Grodów Piastowskich
 6th Memoriał Henryka Łasaka
2007
 2nd Pomorski Klasyk
 4th Overall Szlakiem Walk Majora Hubala
 5th Puchar Uzdrowisk Karpackich
 7th Overall Tour of Małopolska
 7th Overall Bałtyk–Karkonosze Tour
 8th Overall Course de Solidarność et des Champions Olympiques
 8th Overall Dookoła Mazowsza
 10th Overall Szlakiem Grodów Piastowskich
2008
 2nd Overall Szlakiem Walk Majora Hubala
1st Stage 1
 5th Puchar Ministra Obrony Narodowej

References

External links
 

1969 births
Living people
Polish male cyclists
Olympic cyclists of Poland
Cyclists at the 1988 Summer Olympics
Cyclists at the 1992 Summer Olympics
People from Ostrów Wielkopolski
Sportspeople from Greater Poland Voivodeship